Marcel Verschueren (8 February 1928 – 2 December 2008) was a Belgian racing cyclist. He rode in the 1950 Tour de France.

References

1928 births
2008 deaths
Belgian male cyclists
Place of birth missing
20th-century Belgian people